Nanne Meyer (born 12 April 1953 in Hamburg), is a German artist. She is one of the first women artists of the postwar generation who works primarily in drawing. Meyer lives and works in Berlin.

Biography

Meyer was born in Hamburg and studied from 1974 to 1981 at the Hochschule für bildende Künste Hamburg with Gerhard Rühm and Tomas Schmit. After completing the I. Staatsexam, in 1982 she was awarded a DAAD Stipend in London, where she studied animation at the Saint Martins School of Art. In 1986–87 she was awarded the German Rome Prize, a one-year stipend at the Deutsche Akademie Villa Massimo, after which she lived in Frankfurt/Main for several years. In 1993 she moved to Berlin, where since 1994 she teaches as professor at the Kunsthochschule Berlin-Weißensee. In 2013 she received the women artists' prize NRW for drawing and in 2014 the Hannah-Höch Preis in Berlin.

Work

Nanne Meyer's artwork is directly linked to her own personal process of seeing, experiencing and reflecting upon the world, mediated through an experimental sensibility.

Already during her studies, in the 1970s, Meyer placed an emphasis on working in the drawing medium, seeking out connections to the activities of thinking and writing. In making small-format booklets as well as extensive series of drawings she investigates forms of interplay between language and image.

Emerging from the gestures of writing and from an associative understanding of forms, Meyer developed the "Wandlung" series of large format graphite drawings, for which she first became recognized. The German term "Wandlung" or "Transformation", represents a principle of the process-based, the transformative, the fleeting, the unstable, which recurs throughout Meyer's body of work. These are generally divided into thematically linked work-groups made up of small-format series, large-format drawings, as well as artist books and pamphlets.

Books

Since 1986, a central aspect of Nanne Meyer's work has been the making of yearbooks. They contain her archive, document her changing drawing repertoire, her range of forms, reflections from the everyday and key drawings for development in following series of work. To date 24 books with ca. 8500 drawings have been made. Yearbook 16 (September 2000 – March 2002) was published in facsimile in 2003 with support of the Kunstfonds Bonn (Gimlet Verlag Köln).

Most recent work
Taking as point of departure the fleeting and metaphoric aspect of clouds and the views out of airplane windows, since 2000 Meyer has been investigating specific aspects of 
perceptual/spatial experiences. In the works titled "Papierperspektive" ("Paper Perspectives"), various simultaneous points of view and the abstraction of seeing are formulated by means of lines and superimposed with graphic conventions drawn from meteorology and cartography. Emergent are dynamic, floating spaces with multiple perspectives which do not allow the gaze to come to rest. For the artist these drawings are both perceptual reflections of space as well as "thinking conduits". Nanne Meyer's work, including further images not included in this article, is documented on the artist's .

Exhibitions

Selected solo shows

1984
Förderkoje Art Cologne, Köln, Petersen Galerie, Berlin
1989
Kunsthalle Nürnberg
1990 
Art Frankfurt, Petersen Galerie, Berlin
Goethe Institut, Rotterdam
Städtische Galerie, Lüdenscheid
1991
Kunstverein Marburg
1992
Kulturforum Alte Post, Neuss
Städtische Galerie, Delmenhorst
1999
Kunstverein, Eislingen
Städtische Galerie, Tuttlingen
1997
Kunstmuseum, Bonn, "Zeichnung heute I" (with Silvia Bächli and Camill Leberer)
Kunstverein Bochum
1998
Kunstverein Siegen
Städtische Galerie im Lenbachhaus, München
1999
Art forum Berlin, Galerie & Edition Marlene Frei, Zürich
Kunsthalle Winterhur	
2000
Kunstraum Büchsenhausen, Innsbruck (mit Eva-Maria Schön)
2002
Staatliches Museum für Kunst u. Design, Nürnberg
2003
Bucknell University, Samek Art Gallery, Lewisburg, PA 
2004
Kunsthalle Bremen 
2005
Luftblicke, Hamburger Kunsthalle, Saal der Meisterzeichnung 
2006
Kunstverein Würzburg
2008
Institut für moderne Kunst, Nürnberg
2014
Gemäldegalerie Kupferstichkabinett

Selected group shows

1992
"Künstlerbücher", Neues Museum Weserburg, Bremen
1994
"Multiple world", Atlanta College of Art Gallery, Atlanta Georgia, USA
"Die Bücher der Künstler", Institut für Auslandsbez., Ifa – Galerie, Berlin
1996
"Von den Dingen – Gegenstände in der zeitgenössischen Kunst", Museum zu Allerheiligen, Schaffhausen, Städtische Galerie Rähnitzgasse Dresden
1997
"Zeichnen", Germanisches Nationalmuseum, Nürnberg
2001
"Gezeichnet", Nassauischer Kunstverein, Wiesbaden
2002
"Contemporary Positions in German Drawing", Milwaukee Institute of Art & Design"  USA
"Kopfreisen – Jules Verne, Adolf Wölfli und andere Grenzgänger”
Kunstmuseum Bern, Schweiz
"Fluxus und die Folgen", Kunstsommer Wiesbaden 
2003
"Herbarium der Blicke", Kunst- und Ausstellungshalle der BRD, Bonn
2004
"In erster Linie", Museum Fridericianum Kassel
2005
"Die Erfindung des Himmels", Aargauer Kunsthaus, Aarau, Schweiz
"Wittgenstein in New York – Stadt und Architektur in der neueren Kunst auf Papier", Kupferstichkabinett, Berlin
2006
"Kunst in Hamburg. Heute II", Galerie der Gegenwart, Hamburg
2009
"As time goes by – Kunstwerke über Zeit", Berlinische Galerie, Berlin
"Gestern oder im 2. Stock – Karl Valentin, Komik und Kunst seit 1948", Münchner Stadtmuseum		
"Die unsichtbare Hand – Zeitgenössische Zeichnung in der Städtischen Galerie Delmenhorst", Städt. Galerie Delmenhorst  
2010
"Linie, Line, Linea, Zeichnung der Gegenwart", Kunstmuseum Bonn
"je mehr ich zeichne – Zeichnung als Weltentwurf", Museum für Gegenwartskunst, Siegen

Public collections

Kupferstichkabinett Berlin 
Berlinische Galerie – Landesmuseum für moderne Kunst, Photografie und Architektur
Grafische Sammlung Kunsthalle Hamburg, Kupfertichkabinett
Kunsthalle Bremen
Kunstmuseum Bonn
Museum für Kommunikation Frankfurt/Main
Museum für Kunst und Design, Nürnberg
Städtische Galerie Delmenhorst
Gustav-Lübcke-Museum, Hamm
Sammlung Hanck, Museum Kunstpalast Düsseldorf 
Sammlung der Bundesrepublik Deutschland 
Grafische Sammlungen der Bauten des Bundes in Berlin
Artothek, Neuer Berliner Kunstverein 
Sammlung Graf von Faber Castell, Stein bei Nürnberg 
Sammlung Droege Group, Düsseldorf
Sammlung Deutsche Bank
Sammlung Bayrische Vereinsbank Nürnberg 
Sammlung der LandesBank Berlin
Sammlung der Volksfürsorge Hamburg
Kunstsammlung der ZÜRICH in Frankfurt  
Kunstsammlung der Klinik Hirslanden, Schweiz

References

1953 births
German artists
Modern artists
Living people